Black Roses is a 1921 American crime drama film directed by Colin Campbell. Sessue Hayakawa, Myrtle Stedman, Tsuru Aoki, Andrew Robson, and Toyo Fujita appeared in the film.

Plot
As described in a film magazine, when Benson Burleigh (Robson) is found murdered with his gardener Yoda (Hayakawa) beside him with a knife in his hand, the police conclude that Yoda is guilty. While in prison Yoda learns that 'Monocle' Harry (Herbert), Blanche De Vore (Stedman), and Wong Fu (Fujita) framed him of the crime. When the opportunity arrives, with the assistance of his fellow convicts he steals a locomotive while its crew is eating lunch and uses it to burst through the prison yard gates. He drives the locomotive at full speed until they outrun an automobile full of prison guards. With money provided by a fellow cellmate, he poses as a wealthy Japanese nobleman. He outwits the trio of criminals and frees his wife Blossom (Aoki), whom they had kidnapped, and turns them over to the police.

Cast
Sessue Hayakawa as Yoda
Myrtle Stedman as Blanche De Vore
Tsuru Aoki as Blossom
Andrew Robson as Benson Burleigh
Toyo Fujita as Wong Fu
Henry Herbert as 'Monocle' Harry
Harold Holland as Detective Cleary
Carrie Clark Ward as Bridget

References

External links

 

American crime drama films
American silent feature films
American black-and-white films
1921 crime drama films
Film Booking Offices of America films
1921 drama films
1921 films
Films directed by Colin Campbell
1920s American films
Silent American drama films
Films with screenplays by Richard Schayer
Films about prison escapes
1920s English-language films